Fremont–Mills Community School District is a rural public school district headquartered in Tabor, Iowa, serving sections of Fremont and Mills counties.

Communities in its service area are Tabor, Randolph, and Thurman.

It took portions of the former Farragut Community School District when the State of Iowa dissolved it on July 1, 2016.

It is one of several school districts that accepts high school students from the K-8 Hamburg Community School District of Hamburg.

Schools
The district operates two schools on one campus in Tabor:
Fremont–Mills Elementary School
Fremont–Mills Middle and Senior High School

Fremont–Mills High School

Athletics
The Knights compete in the Corner Conference in the following sports:

Cross country (boys and girls)
Volleyball 
Football 
Basketball (boys and girls)
Wrestling 
Track and field (boys and girls)
Golf (boys and girls)
Baseball 
Softball

See also
List of school districts in Iowa
List of high schools in Iowa

References

External links
 Fremont–Mills Community School District
 

School districts in Iowa
Fremont County, Iowa
Mills County, Iowa